Al Muqbali is one of the Arab tribes in the Arabian Peninsula. It is known for courage, generosity and nobility, and for poets known using Baldzer Arabic.

Tribes of Arabia
Tribes of Saudi Arabia